Veetuku Oru Kannagi is a 1984 Indian Tamil-language film, directed and produced by S. A. Chandrasekhar. The film stars Vijayakanth, Sujatha, Nalini and Sangili Murugan.

Plot
Suja, a noted writer, is married to inspector Chandrasekar and has a young daughter. Her sister, Ilavarasi, is married to the abusive Ravi. Vijay is a journalist for a magazine focused on social justice issues and occasionally works with Suja. He meets the orphaned Maadhavi and two fall in love. Ravi kills Ilavarasi and Chandrasekar arrests him. Ravi's business partner Meenakshisundaram and lawyer Mahendran conspire to twist the evidence. The court doesn't have the evidence to convict Ravi and he's freed. He then kills Suja's daughter in front of her but, again, the justice system fails her as he's set up an alibi. Chandrasekar is heartbroken but still believes in the justice system. Suja has lost all faith on the system and is willing to take the law in her own hands in bid for revenge. Ravi is killed mysteriously but it is ruled a suicide. Chandrasekar and Ravi's associates suspect Suja but have no proof. The once loving couple are pitted against each other as Chandrasekar is determined to do his job and uphold the law. Suja, with the help of Vijay and Maadhavi, wants revenge.

Cast

Vijayakanth as Vijay
Sujatha as Suja
Jaishankar as Inspector Chandrasekhar
Nalini as Maadhavi
Sangili Murugan as Meenakshisundaram
Y. G. Mahendran as Criminal Lawyer Mahendran
Raveendar as Ravi
Sathyakala as Kannagi
Ilavarasi
Vennira Aadai Moorthy as SubInspector Senthilnaathan
Typist Gopu
Raja
Pasi Sathya
Vani
Baby Seetha
Ashadevi
Jayamalini as Rani
S. A. Chandrasekhar as Newspaper Delivered Person 
Anuradha dancer

Soundtrack
Soundtrack was composed by Shankar–Ganesh.
"Nee Venmalligai" - Vani Jairam, S. N. Surendar
"Kallallada Mannallada" - P. Susheela
"Then Paandi" - Vani Jairam, S. N. Surendar
"Raatthiri Dhinam" - Shobha Sekhar

References

External links
 
 

1984 films
1980s Tamil-language films
Films scored by Shankar–Ganesh
Films directed by S. A. Chandrasekhar